Helsfyr-Sinsen was a borough of the city of Oslo, Norway up to January 1, 2004, when it was split and merged into Alna and Gamle Oslo boroughs. It consisted of the neighborhoods Helsfyr, Teisen, Etterstad, Keyserløkka, Lille Tøyen, Valle, Løren, Carl Berners plass, Rosenhoff and Sinsen.

Neighbourhoods of Oslo
Gamle Oslo